Mathías Leonardo Vidangossy Rebolledo (born 25 May 1987) is a Chilean professional footballer who currently plays for Unión La Calera as an attacking midfielder or winger.

Club career
Born in Santiago, Vidangossy began his career in the youth squads of Club Deportivo Universidad Católica, but finished his football grooming at Unión Española. He made his Chilean Primera División debuts in 2005, and became a constant feature in the starting lineups.

In June 2007, Vidangossy was signed to a five-year contract with Villarreal CF in Spain, joining compatriots Manuel Pellegrini (coach) and Matías Fernández. However, he would never play any official games for the club, as all of its foreign player spots were used up; he was quickly loaned out to fellow La Liga team UD Almería, but met the same fate.

Vidangossy was subsequently loaned to Chilean club Audax Italiano, which played in the 2008 edition of the Copa Libertadores. Afterwards, he stayed in the country and also on loan, now to Everton de Viña del Mar.

On 23 June 2009, Vidangossy was confirmed as a new Ñublense player, but he was released after only two months, momentarily retiring from football. He joined Ceará Sporting Club of the Brazilian Série A on 17 February 2010 but, shortly after, he returned to his country and signed for San Luis Quillota.

Vidangossy subsequently represented, in quick succession and always in the Chilean top flight, Deportes La Serena, Colo-Colo, Unión Española and Club Deportivo Palestino. On 27 August 2015, he was loaned by the latter side to Chiapas FC, who had the option to make the move permanent.

International career
In 2007, Vidangossy was selected to play for the Chilean under-20 team in the 2007 South American Youth Championship that took place in Paraguay. There, he scored twice against Bolivia.

The nation went on to qualify for the 2007 FIFA U-20 World Cup that took place in Canada: in the quarter-finals against Nigeria, Vidangossy netted the last goal in a 4–0 extra time as the team eventually finished third, their best-ever performance in the category.

Honours

Club
Unión Española
Primera División de Chile (1): 2005 Apertura

Colo-Colo
Primera División de Chile (1): 2014 Apertura

Country
FIFA U-20 World Cup: Third-place 2007

References

External links

1987 births
Living people
Chilean people of Hungarian descent
Footballers from Santiago
Chilean footballers
Association football midfielders
Association football wingers
Chilean Primera División players
Segunda División Profesional de Chile players
Primera B de Chile players
Unión Española footballers
Audax Italiano footballers
Everton de Viña del Mar footballers
Ñublense footballers
San Luis de Quillota footballers
Deportes La Serena footballers
Colo-Colo footballers
Colo-Colo B footballers
Club Deportivo Palestino footballers
Deportes Melipilla footballers
Deportes Valdivia footballers
Deportes Colchagua footballers
Unión La Calera footballers
La Liga players
Villarreal CF players
UD Almería players
Campeonato Brasileiro Série A players
Ceará Sporting Club players
Liga MX players
Chiapas F.C. footballers
Club Universidad Nacional footballers
Chile under-20 international footballers
Chile international footballers
Chilean expatriate footballers
Chilean expatriate sportspeople in Spain
Chilean expatriate sportspeople in Brazil
Chilean expatriate sportspeople in Mexico
Expatriate footballers in Spain
Expatriate footballers in Brazil
Expatriate footballers in Mexico